John Lefferts (December 17, 1785 – September 18, 1829) was a member of the Thirteenth United States Congress as a Democratic-Republican  Representative from New York.  He was also a delegate to the New York State Constitutional Convention of 1821 and a member of the New York State Senate from 1820 to 1825.  He died in Brooklyn, New York and was interred in Greenwood Cemetery.

External links

1785 births
1829 deaths
John
People from Brooklyn
New York (state) state senators
Burials at Green-Wood Cemetery
Democratic-Republican Party members of the United States House of Representatives from New York (state)
19th-century American politicians